Pristhesancus plagipennis is an Australian insect in the assassin bug genus Pristhesancus. Amongst its prey, is the common garden pest, the stinkbug: Musgraveia sulciventris. It is sometime called the bee-killer assassin bug, as it is also known to prey on honey bees. The juveniles (nymphs / instars) have a distinctive bright orange abdomen.

References

External links
 
 

Reduviidae
Insects described in 1865
Insects of Australia